Family Biz is a Canadian television sitcom, filmed in Ottawa, Ontario, Canada starring Doug Murray, Ephraim Ellis and Kate Corbett. Created by James Nadler, the show is currently airing on YTV and France 2. The first episode was shown on YTV. The show has been rated "C8+" in Canada, where it ran for one season from March 6 to December 8, 2009.

Description
An international co-production between Canada's Muse Entertainment, Summit Crescent Productions and France's Breakout Films, Family Biz centres around three latch key kids, Eli (16), Avalon (15) and Ronnie (11), who have the run of the Keller house. Their corporate parents are too busy at work and teen insanity rules! That is until their Dad, Dave Keller, gets fired and decides to work from the Keller attic. To feel useful, Dave launches the Keller Family Corp. and sets about "reinvolving" himself in the lives of his teenage kids, much to his offspring's total embarrassment. Whenever a problem occurs, Dad looks to his years of business knowledge to find the solution, whether it is getting to know his kids through in-depth marketing surveys or outsourcing all their phone messages to India. But mostly he just
drives the Keller kids mad.

Episodes

References

External links
 
 YTV: Family Biz
 Summit Crescent Productions

2000s Canadian teen sitcoms
2009 Canadian television series debuts
2009 Canadian television series endings
YTV (Canadian TV channel) original programming
Television shows filmed in Ottawa
Television series about families
Television series about teenagers
Television series by Muse Entertainment